This is a list of current Christian popes and patriarchs who are notable.

Pope and patriarchs in the Catholic Church

In 2006, Benedict XVI renounced the title of "Patriarch of the West" (Patriarcha Occidentis).

Titular
The patriarchates in the lower table in the Latin Church are titular; that is, their bearers have the title of patriarch for various historical reasons, but those sees are without jurisdiction.

Patriarch of the Assyrian Church of the East

Patriarchs in the Eastern Orthodox Church

Patriarchs of independent Eastern Orthodox Churches

Patriarch of the Ukrainian Orthodox Church – Kyiv Patriarchate

Patriarch of the Russian Old-Orthodox Church

Patriarch of the Turkish Orthodox Church

Pope and patriarchs in the Oriental Orthodox Churches

Popes and patriarchs of Independent Catholic Churches

Patriarch of the Apostolic Catholic Church

Patriarch of the Venezuelan Catholic Apostolic Church

Pope of the Palmarian Catholic Church

Patriarch of the Ukrainian Orthodox Greek Catholic Church

Patriarch of the Servants of Christ Jesus of the Catholic Faith

Patriarch of the Czechoslovak Hussite Church

See also
List of current Christian leaders
Patriarchs
List of Primates in the Anglican Communion

References

 
Patriarchs